Meyers Hill is a summit located in Central New York Region of New York located in the Town of Forestport in Oneida County, northeast of Woodhull.

References

Mountains of Oneida County, New York
Mountains of New York (state)